Tomáš Plíhal (born 28 March 1983) is a Czech professional ice hockey player currently playing for HC Vlci Jablonec nad Nisou of the Czech 2. liga. Plíhal played several seasons in the National Hockey League (NHL) with the San Jose Sharks, who drafted him in the fifth round, 140th overall, in the 2001 NHL Entry Draft.

Playing career
After being selected by the San Jose Sharks in the 2001 NHL Entry Draft, Plíhal moved to Canada to play junior hockey with the Kootenay Ice of the Western Hockey League (WHL). Plíhal played two seasons for the Ice from 2001 through 2003. He then turned professional with the Cleveland Barons of the American Hockey League (AHL), where he played three seasons. Plíhal moved with the team to Worcester (becoming the Worcester Sharks) in 2006–07.

Plíhal was called-up to San Jose on 25 January 2007 and made his NHL debut on 26 January against the Edmonton Oilers. He was returned to Worcester after three games. Plíhal again rotated between Worcester and San Jose for the 2007–08 season. On 3 March 2008 Plíhal scored his first career assist against the Montreal Canadiens. On 9 March he scored on his first career penalty shot on Niklas Bäckström of the Minnesota Wild. In 2008–09, Plíhal played his final season in the San Jose organization, spending it entirely in the NHL.

In 2009, Plíhal signed as a free agent with TPS of the Finnish SM-liiga. Plíhal played three seasons with Turku. In 2012, he signed with Oulun Kärpät. After playing in Finland for five years, Plíhal returned to his home country, signing with HC Oceláři Třinec in 2014.

Career statistics

Regular season and playoffs

International

References

External links

1983 births
Living people
HC Bílí Tygři Liberec players
Cleveland Barons (2001–2006) players
Czech ice hockey left wingers
Heilbronner EC players
HC Kobra Praha players
Kootenay Ice players
EV Landshut players
HC Oceláři Třinec players
Orli Znojmo players
Oulun Kärpät players
People from Frýdlant
San Jose Sharks draft picks
San Jose Sharks players
Stadion Hradec Králové players
Tappara players
HC TPS players
HC Vlci Jablonec nad Nisou players
Worcester Sharks players
Sportspeople from the Liberec Region
Czech expatriate ice hockey players in the United States
Czech expatriate ice hockey players in Canada
Czech expatriate ice hockey players in Finland
Czech expatriate ice hockey players in Germany